The 2018 ITF Men's Circuit is the 2018 edition of the second tier tour for men's professional tennis. It is organised by the International Tennis Federation and is a tier below the ATP Tour. The ITF Men's Circuit includes tournaments with prize money ranging from $15,000 up to $25,000.

Key

Month

July

August

September

External links
 International Tennis Federation official website

2018 ITF Men's Circuit